King Island (King's Island in early US sources) is an island in the Bering Sea, west of Alaska.

Geography

It was named by James Cook, first European to sight the island in 1778, for Lt. James King, a member of his party. It is part of the Bering Sea unit of the Alaska Maritime National Wildlife Refuge.

Population
The island was once the winter home of a group of about 413 Inupiat who called themselves Asiuluk, meaning "people of the sea," or Ugiuvaŋmiut, from Ugiuvak, the village of King Island and "miut," meaning "people of" or "group of people".

The Ugiuvaŋmiut spent their summers engaging in subsistence hunting and gathering on King Island and on the mainland near the location of present-day Nome, Alaska. Their winters were spent in other subsistence activities, particularly hunting and fishing on the ice. Subsistence activities on and around the island included hunting seals and walruses, crab fishing, and gathering bird eggs and other foods. The spring and summer was the important time of gathering to the Ukivokmiut, while the winters were the time of dance. Due to the limited daylight during the winter, the days were spent dancing in the "Qagri", or men's communal house. As an example, the month of December is known to the Uġiuvaŋmiut as Sauyatugvik or "the time of drumming".

After the establishment of Nome, the islanders began to sell intricate carvings to residents of Nome during the summer.

Population relocation
In the mid-1900s the Bureau of Indian Affairs closed the school on Uġiuvak, forcefully taking the children of Ukivok to go to school on mainland Alaska, leaving the elders and adults to gather the needed food for winter. Because the children were not on the island to help gather food, the adults and elders had no choice but to move to mainland Alaska to make their living. By 1970, all King Island people had moved to mainland Alaska year-round.

Although the King Islanders have moved off the island, they have kept a very distinct cultural identity, living a very similar life as they had on the island. Some King Islanders still return to the island to gather subsistence foods, such as walrus and seal.

In 2005 and 2006 the National Science Foundation (NSF) funded a research project which brought a few King 
Island natives back to the island. Some participants had not been back to the island in 50 years.

Demographics

King Island first appeared on the 1880 U.S. Census as the unincorporated native eskimo village of "Ookivagamute." In 1890, it returned as Uġiuvak. It next appeared in 1910 as King Island and would continue to report until 1960, with the exception of 1950 when no figure was reported. It next reported as Uġiuvak again, classified as a native village (ANVSA) in 1980 and 1990, but with no residents. It has not reported since.

Gallery

See also
 King Island Native Community

Explanatory notes

External links

 Ancient mask returned to Alaska ghost village, MSNBC, January 18, 2008
 Photogallery of traditional ecological knowledge (TEK) of King Island, Alaska , Oregon State University, October 28, 2008
 Munoz photographs - King Island early 1950s
 Survey of a King Island kayak 
 Deanna M Kingston, "King Island",  Encyclopedia of the Arctic, A-F p 1090, Routledge, 2012. 
 Curtis, Edward P The North American Indian. Volume 20 - The Alaskan Eskimo. p 99-103
 https://web.archive.org/web/20130512233632/http://www.kawerak.org/tribalHomePages/kingIsland/
 http://www.alaskadispatch.com/article/king-island-living-community-and-mystical-place 

Islands of the Bering Sea
Islands of Alaska
Ghost towns in Alaska
Islands of Nome Census Area, Alaska
Alaska Maritime National Wildlife Refuge
Protected areas of Nome Census Area, Alaska
Islands of Unorganized Borough, Alaska
King island
Ghost towns in the United States
Ghost towns in North America
Towns in the United States